Neomirandea is a genus of Central American and South American flowering plants in the boneset tribe within the sunflower family.

 Species

References

Asteraceae genera
Eupatorieae